Donn Arden (1916 or 1917 – November 2, 1994) was an American choreographer and producer.

Biography 
Born Arlyle Arden Peterson Arden to a railway executive and a housewife, he grew up in St. Louis.

By the age of nine he was already making money with dancing, he was considered a good tap dancer.
Arden never married, but he was always surrounded by beautiful women, and by his own account couldn't be bothered with marriage, although he had been engaged in his younger years.
Arden lived in California and Las Vegas for most of his adult life.

Career 
Arden studied dancing with Robert Alton, who later became a Broadway director. Arden decided he was better suited to organize and direct dance shows rather than perform in them. Arden got his first break in Cleveland, where he staged floor shows in clubs operated by racketeer Moe Dalitz. "My success was due to…I hate to use the word 'mafia'," Arden once said. "Moe was a great guy to work for. He believed in spending money."

Arden's dance troupe headlined the Desert Inn's opening in 1950. He later developed the Lido de Paris show (based on the show in the Lido in Paris), which ran at the Stardust from 1958 to 1991, and the Jubilee! show at Bally's.

Donn Arden was credited with developing the Las Vegas showgirl image — a statuesque dancer in sequins, feathers and wearing a tall headpiece.

Jubilee! ran for 34 years in the Jubilee! Theatre at Bally's in Las Vegas. The show closed on February 11, 2016, drawing legions of former cast members, designers, and fans.

Noteworthy 
Actress and model Valerie Perrine started her career with Arden. He remembered her as "a secretary from Scottsdale with a lisp".
Actress Goldie Hawn is reputed to have been part of his troupe at the Desert Inn but was fired by Arden after only a few weeks. He remembered her as "a skinny fruitcake".
Bob Mackie was one time costume designer for Donn Arden
Screenwriter Joseph Stefano, who wrote the Psycho screenplay for Alfred Hitchcock, wrote music and lyrics for Arden's stage shows.
 Ray Vasquez Lead Singer for Donn Arden productions.

Awards 
The Las Vegas Chamber of Commerce presented Arden with its first Personality of the Year award in the 1970s.

Further reading 
Hopkins, A.D. & K.J. Evans, The First 100: Portraits of the Men and Women Who Shaped Las Vegas, Huntington Press, 1999, 368p.,

References

External links
 Donn Arden bio — Father of the Feathers
 Las Vegas Mercury — Tales of Vegas Past: Show me the girl
 Donn Arden filmography at New York Times
 
 Donn Arden on the Las Vegas First 100 website

People from the Las Vegas Valley
1910s births
1994 deaths
American choreographers